Chicera River may refer to one of the following rivers in Romania:

 Chicera - tributary of the Asău River
 Chicera - tributary of the Râul Mare in Alba County

See also 
 Padina Chicera River